Glipidiomorpha septentrionalis is a species of beetle in the genus Glipidiomorpha of the family Mordellidae. It was described in 1994 by Fransicolo.

References

Beetles described in 1994
Mordellidae